Elizabeth McIngvale (born 1987) is the founder of Peace of Mind, a non-profit organization for people with obsessive-compulsive disorder (OCD). She herself was diagnosed with OCD at the age of 12, and at age 18 became the national spokesperson for the International OCD Foundation. She lives in Houston, Texas and is the daughter of area businessman Jim McIngvale and his wife Linda.

At one point doctors believed McIngvale's OCD was too severe to be treated. Her rituals included having to repeat menial tasks 42 times, obsessions with religious symbolism, and washing her hands over 100 times a day. She engaged in exposure with response prevention (ERP) treatment for her OCD and now successfully manages her illness.

She completed her bachelor's degree in 2009 and Master's in 2010 from Loyola University Chicago. She earned her PhD from the University of Houston's Graduate College of Social Work in 2014. She is now an assistant professor at Baylor College of Medicine. McIngvale serves on multiple non-profit boards and is an advocate/speaker for mental illness on a national platform. Dr. McIngvale also founded and runs the OCD Challenge website which is a free self-help website for OCD.

References

External links
Elizabeth Mcingvale in International OCD Foundation
Peace of Mind

1987 births
American disability rights activists
Living people
Loyola University Chicago alumni
People from Houston
People with obsessive–compulsive disorder